Ballad 21 F/W is the fourth extended play (EP) by South Korean boy group, 2AM, released on November 1, 2021. It was the first release by 2AM since their album, Let's Talk, in 2014.

Background
On October 7, 2021, member Lee Chang-min announced that 2AM was preparing to make a comeback. Shortly after, it was reported the group had already recorded two title tracks, one written by Bang Si-hyuk and one by Park Jin-young.

On October 12, 2AM released a time table to social media, confirming that they would be releasing a new EP on November 1, 2021, with both music videos which would star 2PM member Junho and actor Kim So-hyun.

Release and promotion
2AM began music show promotions at M Countdown, where they performed the two title tracks "Should've Known" and "No Good In Good-bye". The group performed the two songs in succeeding music shows Music Bank, Show! Music Core.

On November 4, 2021, the group appeared in web show IU's Palette where host IU covered the group's 2008 b-side "What Should I Do" from the repackage album I Was Wrong , while they covered IU's 2011 hit single "Hold My Hand".
On the same day, the group guested on the 74th episode of Jessi's Showterview where they simultaneously promoted Ballad 21 F/W.

Track listing

Charts

Release history

References

2021 EPs
2AM (band) albums
Korean-language EPs
Stone Music Entertainment EPs